Claudville is an unincorporated community in Patrick County, Virginia, United States. It is located near the Virginia/North Carolina state line at the intersection of Virginia State Route 103 and Virginia State Route 104. It is named after Virginia governor Claude A. Swanson who established the community's post office. Local business include a cafe opened by lifelong resident Harold E. Slate I and a number of churches. The nearest community is Ararat, 5.3 miles away. The area is known for Civil War reenactments, and a goldfish farm. In October 2009, the area opened the first ever public white spaces broadband network. There is one school, Trinity Christian School.

Notable residents
 Tim Goad, NFL player

References

External links
 Patrick County Chamber of Commerce

Unincorporated communities in Patrick County, Virginia
Unincorporated communities in Virginia